
The Khari Khari Lakes (Quechua khari khari a thorny medical plant, a species of rubus, hispanicized spellings Cari Cari, Kari Kari, Kari-Kari) are two closely connected artificial lakes, San Ildefonso and San Pablo (now integrated into San Ildefonso) situated in the Khari Khari mountain range of Bolivia. The lakes lie about 8 km east of Potosí in the Potosí Department, Tomás Frías Province, Potosí Municipality, northeast of the lakes named San Sebastián and Planilla which are also artificial lakes.

See also 
 Khari Khari

References 

Lakes of Potosí Department